Naunyn-Schmiedeberg's Archives of Pharmacology (formerly Naunyn-Schmiedebergs Archiv für Pharmakologie and Naunyn-Schmiedebergs Archiv für Pharmakologie und experimentelle Pathologie) is a peer-reviewed scientific journal of pharmacology. The journal was established in 1873 by Bernhard Naunyn, Oswald Schmiedeberg, and Edwin Klebs. It is the official journal of the German Society of Experimental and Clinical Pharmacology and Toxicology (DGPT), and of the Sphingolipid Club.

The journal is published by Springer on a monthly basis and is currently edited by Roland Seifert.

Abstracting and indexing

The journal is indexed and abstracted in the following bibliographics databases:

According to the Journal Citation Reports, the journal has a 2017 impact factor of 2.238.

References

Further reading

External links

Pharmacology journals
Publications established in 1873
Springer Science+Business Media academic journals
English-language journals